A bibliography of notable books on Hindi cinema.

Biographical

General

Specific films

Music

See also

 List of Hindi films
 Bibliography of India

References 

 
 
 

Bibliographies of film
Hindi cinema
Books about India